Hüseyin Hüsnü Pasha (Modern Turkish: Hüseyin Hüsnü Paşa; 1852–1918) was an Ottoman admiral, who participated in the Russo-Turkish War (1877–78). In 1909 he became the Minister of the Ottoman Navy (Bahriye Nazırı).

Gallery

References

1852 births
1918 deaths
Ottoman Empire admirals